Koulouba is a place name that may refer to:
 Koulouba, Bamako, Mali
 Koulouba, Ouagadougou, Burkina Faso